Ihor Melnyk (Ukrainian: Ігор Мельник, Russian: Игорь Мельник; other transliterations: Igor; Melnik or Melnick) may refer to the following people:

Igor Melnik (born 1997), Russian football forward
 Ihor Melnyk (footballer, born 1983), Ukrainian football forward
 Ihor Melnyk (footballer, born 1986), Ukrainian football forward